Iridana nigeriana, the Nigerian sapphire gem, is a butterfly in the family Lycaenidae. It is found in Ivory Coast, Ghana, southern and eastern Nigeria and Cameroon. The habitat consists of forests.

The larvae and pupae have been recorded on a tree trunk near a Crematogaster ant nest.  The larvae spin a light web over their daylight shelters in crevices in the bark of tree trunks.

References

Butterflies described in 1964
Poritiinae